"Give Up the Goods (Just Step)" is the fourth and final single from Mobb Deep's second album The Infamous, featuring Big Noyd. Produced by Q-Tip, the song contains a sample of "That's All Right With Me" by Esther Phillips.

Background
Speaking with Complex, Prodigy detailed the process that went into making the song:

Music video
Much like their later hit "Burn", parts of the music video are in black and white. Most of the video takes place in a nightclub.

Track listing
Side A
"Give Up the Goods (Just Step)" (Radio Edit)

Side B
"Give Up the Goods (Just Step)" (Album Version)
"Give Up the Goods (Just Step)" (Album Version Instrumental)

References 

1995 songs
1996 singles
Loud Records singles
Mobb Deep songs
Song recordings produced by Q-Tip (musician)
Songs written by Havoc (musician)
Songs written by Prodigy (rapper)
Songs written by Q-Tip (musician)